Amy Adams is an American actress who made her film debut in the 1999 black comedy Drop Dead Gorgeous. She went on to guest star in a variety of television shows, including That '70s Show, Charmed, Buffy the Vampire Slayer, and The Office, and also appeared in minor film roles. In 2002, she had her first major role in Steven Spielberg's biographical crime drama Catch Me If You Can. However, the film did not launch her career, as Spielberg had hoped. Three years later, she had her breakthrough by playing a joyful pregnant woman in Junebug (2005), for which she received her first Academy Award for Best Supporting Actress nomination. Two years later, Adams starred in the Disney romantic comedy Enchanted, for which she was nominated for her first Golden Globe Award for Best Actress (Comedy or Musical).

In 2008, Adams played a naive nun in the drama Doubt, opposite Philip Seymour Hoffman and Meryl Streep, for which she received her second Oscar nomination for Best Supporting Actress. She then appeared in the comedy-drama Julie & Julia, co-starring Streep, and played Amelia Earhart in the adventure comedy sequel Night at the Museum: Battle of the Smithsonian (both 2009). The following year, she expanded into dramatic roles by playing a tough barmaid in David O. Russell's sports drama The Fighter (2010), which gained her a third Academy Award nomination for Best Supporting Actress. Following a role in the musical comedy The Muppets (2011), Adams played the strong-willed wife of a cult leader in Paul Thomas Anderson's drama The Master, opposite Hoffman. Her performance in the latter earned her a fourth Best Supporting Actress nomination at the Oscars.

Among her three film releases of 2013, Adams played Lois Lane in the superhero film Man of Steel, and starred as a con woman in Russell's crime comedy American Hustle (2013). For the latter, she won the Golden Globe Award for Best Actress (Comedy or Musical) and received her first Academy Award for Best Actress nomination. She next portrayed the artist Margaret Keane in Tim Burton's biopic Big Eyes (2014), for which she won a second consecutive Golden Globe Award for Best Actress (Comedy or Musical), becoming the fourth actress to achieve this feat. In 2016, she reprised her role of Lane in Batman v Superman: Dawn of Justice, her highest-grossing release. In the same year, Adams played intellectual women troubled by their memories in the science fiction film Arrival and the psychological thriller Nocturnal Animals, to positive reviews. She went on to gain acclaim and a Primetime Emmy Award nomination for playing a self-harming reporter in the HBO thriller miniseries Sharp Objects (2018), and she received another Oscar nomination for portraying Lynne Cheney in the satirical film Vice (2018).

Film

Television

Stage

Music videos

Discography

See also 
List of awards and nominations received by Amy Adams

Notes

References

External links 
 

Adams, Amy
Adams, Amy